Télé Lyon Métropole is a private local TV channel in the greater Lyon area.

The beginning 

Télé Lyon Métropole (TLM) was launched on 25 November, 1988 by Roger Caille, director of Jet Services, in the Tour du Crédit Lyonnais. Programming took place at 21 boulevard Yves Farge in Lyon 20 February 1989. TLM is the oldest local TV channel in France.

Organisation 

Directors :

1988-1993 : 
Roger Caille, Director of Jet Services (Creator of the Channel, 1988–1989)
    

1994-2001 :
Louis-Bertrand Raffour.
Etienne Mallet.

2001 - Today : 
Christian Coustal, SocPresse : 2001-2006
Gérard Colin, General Director of Le Progrès : 2006-2007.
Pierre Fanneau, General director of Le Progrès : 2007-today.

See also 
Website of TLM

Television channels and stations established in 1988
Television stations in France
Mass media in Lyon